Hermann III (c.994/995 - April 1, 1012) was a member of the Conradine dynasty. He was Duke of Swabia from 1003 until 1012.

Life
Hermann was the son of Herman II, Duke of Swabia and his wife Gerberga of Burgundy, daughter of Conrad I of Burgundy. He had many illustrious relatives. Through his father, Hermann was descended from Henry the Fowler; through his mother from Louis IV of France, Alfred the Great and Charlemagne. Hermann's sister, Gisela of Swabia, married Emperor Conrad II.

Inheritance and regency
In 1003, when Hermann was about nine years old, his father died and Hermann inherited the duchy of Swabia. Since he was a minor, Hermann's reign as duke was effectively controlled by his cousin, the King of Germany, Henry II, who was his guardian. Henry II was mistrustful of the Conradines. Herman III's father, Herman II, had opposed the election of Henry II as king of Germany in 1002, and promoted himself as a rival candidate for the throne. Henry II thus used his position as Hermann's guardian to limit the power of the dukes of Swabia. He took control of key places in Swabia himself (including Hohentwiel, Breisach and Zürich), and replaced the ducal mint with a royal mint. He separated Alsace from the duchy of Swabia and gave control of Alsace to one of his relatives, Count Gerhard. Henry's control over Swabia was still present when Hermann died, aged about eighteen, in 1012.

Hermann III did not marry and had no heirs. The male line of the Conradines of Swabia came to an end with his death. Henry III selected Ernest to succeed him; two years later, Ernest married Hermann's sister Gisela of Swabia.

Notes

Sources
 
S.Weinfurter, Heinrich II. (1002-1024) Herrscher am Ende der Zeiten

External links
Hermann III, Herzog von Schwaben (in German)

1012 deaths
Dukes of Swabia
Medieval child monarchs
Conradines
Year of birth unknown
Year of birth uncertain